Sara-Marie Fedele (born 18 August 1978) is a former Australian television reality show contestant, on Big Brother Australia 2001, who gained fame as being one of the loudest and most flamboyant housemates. She is also a plus-size model.

Career

Big Brother
On Big Brother, Fedele became known for the "bum dance" she performed while in the House, as well as for her bunny ears headband and chubby physique. She was evicted on 15 July 2001, after making it to the final 3, and finished her stay in the house in 3rd place. She had been eligible for eviction six previous times.

Post-Big Brother
Fedele released a humour book, a CD single (a cover of "I'm So Excited", titled "I'm So Excited (The Bum Dance)" – with The Sirens), and a line of sleepwear after leaving the Big Brother House. She was a housemate on Australian Celebrity Big Brother in 2002, and later a presenter on children's television series, Totally Wild. Her celebrity subsequently cooled and she took a retail job in Sydney. She was a contestant in series two of Dancing with the Stars in early 2005. It was at this point that her dramatic weight loss became widely known. She also appeared in television advertisements in 2005. Soon after, she underwent breast lift surgery because of excessive sagging, probably due to her weight loss. The surgery apparently cost $14,050 and was featured in the TV series Body Work.

On the Big Brother website, during the sixth season, there was a poll asking Big Brother fans who their favorite Big Brother Housemate of all time was. Fedele came first.

Fedele also made an appearance on John Safran vs God, where she was featured in a focus group to do with the Israeli–Palestinian conflict.

In 2006, she appeared on an episode of Australia's Celebrity Survivor as a friend of contestant Imogen Bailey, who had been a fellow contestant of Fedele's on the first series of Celebrity Big Brother.

In 2008, she appeared as a panelist on Big Mouth, Big Brothers weekly panel show.

After working in retail and childcare, Fedele became a plus-sized model for BGM in Sydney in 2010. Later she began working in childcare and retail.

Discography

Singles

References

External links
 

1978 births
Big Brother (Australian TV series) contestants
Plus-size models
Living people
Women television personalities